Amma is a 1976 Indian Malayalam-language film, directed by M. Krishnan Nair and produced by K. P. Kottarakkara. The film stars Madhu, Srividya, Adoor Bhasi and Jose Prakash. It is a remake of the Bengali film Maya Mriga (1960), itself based on the play of the same name by Nihar Ranjan Gupta.

Plot

Cast 

Madhu
Srividya
Adoor Bhasi
Jose Prakash
Paul Vengola
Ambili
K. R. Vijaya
Kaduvakulam Antony
Khadeeja
Kunchan
Marykutty
P. R. Menon
Ravikumar
Roja Ramani
Shylaja

Soundtrack 
The music was composed by M. K. Arjunan and the lyrics were written by Sreekumaran Thampi.

References

External links 
 

1970s Malayalam-language films
1976 films
Films based on works by Nihar Ranjan Gupta
Films directed by M. Krishnan Nair
Malayalam remakes of Bengali films